Theion may refer to
, Greek for "sulfur"
, Greek for "divine", see Theos (disambiguation)